The Raigam Tele'es Most Popular Actress Award is presented annually in Sri Lanka by the Kingdom of Raigam for the most Popular Sri Lankan television actress of the year, determined by a publicly popular vote.

The award was first given in 2007. Following is a list of the winners of this award since 2007.

Award winners

References

Popular Actress
Television acting awards
Awards for actresses